{{DISPLAYTITLE:C5H12O}}

The molecular formula C5H12O (molar mass: 88.15 g/mol, exact mass: 88.088815) may refer to:
 One of the amyl alcohols:
 1-Pentanol 
 tert-Amyl alcohol
 Isoamyl alcohol
 Neopentyl alcohol
 2-Methyl-1-butanol
 3-Methyl-2-butanol
 2-Pentanol
 3-Pentanol
 An ether:
 Methyl tert-butyl ether
 Methyl n-butyl ether (CH3-O-C4H9)